The following are the telephone codes in the Central African Republic.

Current calling formats
 +236 XXXX XXXX - from outside the Central African Republic
 XXXX XXXX - from inside the Central African Republic
The NSN length is eight digits.

List of number ranges in the Central African Republic

Changes as of 1 November 2007
The Agence chargée de la Régulation des Télécommunications (ART), Bangui, announces the introduction of new resources in the National Numbering Plan (NNP) of the Central African Republic.

The new eight-digit will become effective on Thursday, 1 November 2007, at 0500 hours UTC.

The National Numbering Plan (NNP) will change from six (6) to eight (8) digits in accordance with ITU-T E.164 Recommendation.

•	Mobile telephone service

•	Fixed telephone service

References

Central African Republic
Telecommunications in the Central African Republic
Telephone numbers